State Road 72 (NM 72) is a state highway in the US state of New Mexico. NM 72's western terminus is at Interstate 25 (I-25) in Raton, and the eastern terminus is in Folsom at NM 456; in between, it traverses the top of Johnson Mesa. It is the only road by which the general public can access the top of a mesa in the Raton-Clayton volcanic field.

Major intersections

See also

References

072
Transportation in Colfax County, New Mexico
Transportation in Union County, New Mexico